Juden Creek is a stream in Cape Girardeau County in the U.S. state of Missouri. It is a tributary of the Mississippi River.

Juden Creek has the name of John Juden, an early settler.

See also
List of rivers of Missouri

References

Rivers of Cape Girardeau County, Missouri
Rivers of Missouri